Newfane is the shire town (county seat) of Windham County, Vermont, United States. The population was 1,645 at the 2020 census. The town includes the villages of Newfane, Williamsville, and South Newfane.

History
One of the New Hampshire grants, the town was chartered on June 19, 1753, by Governor Benning Wentworth, who named it Fane after John Fane, the 7th Earl of Westmoreland. But hostilities during the French and Indian War prevented its settlement. Because a first town meeting was not held within the required five years, the charter was deemed null and void. So Wentworth issued an entirely new charter on November 3, 1761, as New Fane. The town was settled in 1766 by families from Worcester County, Massachusetts. Newfane became the shire town of the county before 1812. A village was built atop Newfane Hill, including the county buildings. But because of winter travel difficulties, it was relocated to the flatland below in 1825, until 1882 called Fayetteville after the Marquis de Lafayette.

The town has a diversified terrain, with both high hills and deep valleys. Farmers found good soil for cultivation on the intervales, and for grazing livestock on the uplands. Various streams provided water power for mills, and by 1859 industries included manufacturers of both leather and linseed oil, two flour mills, two lumber mills, and a large carriage factory. As a result, Newfane became prosperous during the 19th century, when it built the Federal, Greek Revival and Victorian architecture that today makes it a tourist destination.

Geography

According to the United States Census Bureau, the town has a total area of 40.4 square miles (104.6 km2), of which 40.2 square miles (104.2 km2) is land and 0.1 square mile (0.4 km2) (0.35%) is water. The West and Rock rivers flow through the town.

Newfane is crossed by Vermont Route 30.

The West River in Newfane yielded the largest gold nugget ever found in New England, at 6.5oz.

Demographics

As of the census of 2000, there were 1,680 people, 693 households, and 464 families residing in the town.  The population density was 41.7 people per square mile (16.1/km2).  There were 977 housing units at an average density of 24.3 per square mile (9.4/km2).  The racial makeup of the town was 98.10% White, 0.18% Black or African American, 0.30% Native American, 0.12% Asian, 0.12% Pacific Islander, 0.06% from other races, and 1.13% from two or more races. Hispanic or Latino of any race were 0.95% of the population.

There were 693 households, out of which 31.3% had children under the age of 18 living with them, 57.1% were married couples living together, 6.3% had a female householder with no husband present, and 33.0% were non-families. 24.1% of all households were made up of individuals, and 7.8% had someone living alone who was 65 years of age or older.  The average household size was 2.42 and the average family size was 2.88.

In the town, the population was spread out, with 23.9% under the age of 18, 4.6% from 18 to 24, 27.6% from 25 to 44, 32.4% from 45 to 64, and 11.5% who were 65 years of age or older.  The median age was 42 years. For every 100 females, there were 91.6 males.  For every 100 females age 18 and over, there were 92.8 males.

The median income for a household in the town was $45,735, and the median income for a family was $51,328. Males had a median income of $33,882 versus $27,426 for females. The per capita income for the town was $22,215.  About 4.7% of families and 5.1% of the population were below the poverty line, including 2.1% of those under age 18 and 7.9% of those age 65 or over.

Site of interest

 Williamsville Covered Bridge, built in 1870

Notable people 

 Harrison G. O. Blake, US congressman
 Paul A. Chase, Associate Justice of the Vermont Supreme Court
 Ralph B. DeWitt, Brigadier general in the Marine Corps
 Asa Belknap Foster, businessman and politician
 Frank L. Fish, Associate Justice of the Vermont Supreme Court
 Robert Fritz, author, composer and film-maker
 John Kenneth Galbraith, economist
 Arthur Otis Howe, Vermont state representative and senator 
 Marshall Otis Howe, Vermont state legislator
 Luke Knowlton, founder of Newfane, Justice of the Vermont Supreme Court, member of the Vermont House of Representatives
 Paul Holland Knowlton, businessman and politician
 John H. Merrifield, politician
 Archer Mayor, author of mystery novels
 Henriette Mantel, Emmy Award-winning writer, actress, producer, director, and stand-up comic
 Lee Stephen Tillotson, Adjutant General of the Vermont National Guard

Popular culture
In 2006, Newfane became one of the first American towns to pass a resolution endorsing the impeachment of President George W. Bush.

In H.P. Lovecraft's "The Whisperer in Darkness", the protagonist is driven through Newfane on his way to Townshend.

Newfane was featured in episode 8, season 4, of the TV series "Route 66" in 1963. A sign for The Village Store at Newfane, Vermont, 1876, appears in an early scene.

Newfane served as the visual inspiration for Peter Spier's illustrated children's book of "The Fox Went Out on a Chilly Night."

Climate
This climatic region is typified by large seasonal temperature differences, with warm to hot (and often humid) summers and cold (sometimes severely cold) winters.  According to the Köppen Climate Classification system, Newfane has a humid continental climate, abbreviated "Dfb" on climate maps.

References

External links

 Official website
 Moore Free Library

 
Towns in Vermont
County seats in Vermont
Towns in Windham County, Vermont
1761 establishments in the Thirteen Colonies